Džaferović is a surname, derived from the Turkish personal name Cafer ("Jaafar"), ultimately of Arabic origin. Notable people with the surname include:

Katarina Džaferović (born 2002), Montenegrin handball player
Šefik Džaferović (born 1957), Bosnian politician
Vanja Džaferović (born 1983), Croatian actor, TV personality, and footballer

Bosnian surnames